National Highway 102B, commonly referred to as NH 102B is a national highway in  India. It is a spur road of National Highway 2. NH-102B traverses the states of Manipur and Mizoram in India. It is known as  Guite road by Gazette Order of the Government of Manipur.

Route description 
Manipur
Churachandpur, Singngat, Suangdoh, Mualnuam, Sinzawl, Tuivai Road.
Mizoram

Ngopa, Hliappui, Saichal, Keifang.

Major intersections 
 
  Terminal near Churachandpur.
  Terminal near Keifang.

See also 

 List of National Highways in India
 List of National Highways in India by state

References

External links 

 NH 102B on OpenStreetMap

National highways in India
National Highways in Manipur
National Highways in Mizoram